Šumavské Hoštice is a municipality and village in Prachatice District in the South Bohemian Region of the Czech Republic. It has about 400 inhabitants.

Administrative parts
Villages of Kosmo, Škarez 2.díl and Vojslavice are administrative parts of Šumavské Hoštice.

References

Villages in Prachatice District